Roxana Luna Porquillo (born 24 March 1981) is a Mexican politician affiliated with the PRD. As of 2013 she served as Deputy of the LXII Legislature of the Mexican Congress representing Puebla.

References

1981 births
Living people
Politicians from Puebla
Women members of the Chamber of Deputies (Mexico)
Party of the Democratic Revolution politicians
21st-century Mexican politicians
21st-century Mexican women politicians
Meritorious Autonomous University of Puebla alumni
Deputies of the LXII Legislature of Mexico
Members of the Chamber of Deputies (Mexico) for Puebla